The MY Bob Barker was a ship owned and operated by the Sea Shepherd Conservation Society, named after American television game show host and animal rights activist Bob Barker, whose donation of $5 million to the society facilitated the purchase of the ship. She began operating for the group in late 2009 / early 2010 in its campaign against whaling by Japanese fisheries. In October 2010, Sea Shepherd stated that Bob Barker had completed a major refit in Hobart, Tasmania. Hobart is now the ship's honorary home port.

History

Overview 
Bob Barker is described as a "long-range fast ice" vessel measuring  It was built in Norway in 1950 as the whale catcher Pol XIV, but was deleted from the Norwegian ship registry in 2004, and sold to a Cook Islands registry concern. It was eventually purchased by the Sea Shepherd Conservation Society and refitted in Africa.

On 19 February 2010, Japanese officials said that Bob Barkers Togo registry had been withdrawn. On 24 May 2010, the Sea Shepherd Conservation Society stated that Bob Barker was now registered under the Dutch flag.

Sea Shepherd operations 
One of its first actions was to take video footage of the collision between Ady Gil and a Japanese security vessel, after which she took aboard the crew from the stricken Sea Shepherd craft.

On 6 February 2010, while obstructing the slip-way of Nisshin Maru factory ship, Bob Barker collided with Yūshin Maru No. 3, resulting in a  gash in Bob Barkers hull above the waterline. The Institute of Cetacean Research reported minor damage to a handrail and to the hull of its ship. Both Sea Shepherd and the ICR accused the other of intentionally causing the crash.

On 25 February 2010, Sea Shepherd reported that Bob Barker, which had been following the whaling fleet after Steve Irwin broke off pursuit to return to port, was suffering from a fuel valve problem and would be returning to port, ending the organization's operations for the 2009–2010 whaling season.

On 9 February 2011, Sea Shepherd reported that Bob Barker, which had been searching for the whaling fleet alongside the Sea Shepherd vessel Gojira (Now ) began blocking Nisshin Marus slipway.

On 5 March 2012, Sea Shepherd reported that after a lengthy search Bob Barker found the whaling fleet's factory ship, Nisshin Maru. Three days later, on 8 March 2012, the whalers left the Southern Ocean for the 2011–12 season.

On 20 February 2013, the Japanese whaling ship Nisshin Maru rammed Bob Barker, Steve Irwin and Sun Laurel multiple times in a confrontation in the Southern Ocean, north of Australia's Casey Research Station in Antarctica. Bob Barker was hit on the stern, with Nisshin Marus bow knocking down several of Bob Barkers antennas. Bob Barker issued a mayday after losing power.

Following repair from damage, January to March 2014 saw the MY Bob Barkers embark on Operation Relentless - it's last Southern Ocean mission, with a total of 99 days at sea.  In February the MY Bob Barker was involved in a collision, this time with the Yushin Maru No. 3, resulting in the  MY Bob Barkersuffering a cracked hull and broken ribs - though damage did not affect ship operations. Damage was significant enough to be visible to the crew from within the ship.

On March 31, 2014 the Institute of Cetacean Research and parent company Kyoto Senpaku are sued by the International Court of Justice and forced to suspend operations.  

However advances in the radar technologies of whaling fleets made it increasingly difficult for the MY Bob Barker to find and pursue whaling fleets.

From 2016 until its retirement in 2022, the MY Bob Barker operated a range of campaigns in West Africa in partnership with several African countries. These campaigns are meant to bring an end to illegal fishing in West African waters.

On 12 November 2022, the MY Bob Barker was retired from the Sea Shepherd fleet and sent to Turkey for recycling.

References 

Sea Shepherd Conservation Society ships
Ships built in Fredrikstad
Whaling ships
1950 ships